Killik may refer to:

 Killik, Alaca
 Killik, Döşemealtı, a village in Antalya, Turkey
 Killik & Co, a British retail investment company
 Killik Cup, a rugby union trophy sponsored by Killik & Co
 Killik Formation, a triassic fossiliferous stratigraphic unit in Turkey
 Killik River, a river in Alaska
 Killik, an insectoid species in Star Wars novel the Dark Nest trilogy
 Kilik Pass, an alternative spelling.

See also
 Kilik (disambiguation)